Les Pavillons-sous-Bois is a railway station located on the Île-de-France tramway Line 4 in the eponymous commune of Les Pavillons-sous-Bois.

The station was formerly named Raincy-Pavillons when put into service in 1875.

References

External links
 

Railway stations in France opened in 1875
Railway stations in Seine-Saint-Denis